Basket Club d'Orchies or just BC Orchies is a basketball club based in Orchies, France that plays in the NM1.

Results
{|  class="wikitable" style="font-size:85%"
|- bgcolor=
!Season
!Tier
!League
!
!Postseason
!French Cup
!European competitions
|-
|-
|style="background:#efefef;"|2010–11
| align="center"| 3
| Nationale 1
| style="background: " align="center"| 11
| style="background: "|–
| style="background: "| Last 32
| –
|-
|style="background:#efefef;"|2011–12
| align="center"| 3
| Nationale 1
| style="background: " align="center"| 3
| style="background:#ACE1AF"|Semifinalist
| style="background: "|Last 32
| –
|-
|style="background:#efefef;"|2012–13
| align="center"| 3
| Nationale 1
| style="background:gold" align="center"| 1
| style="background:#97DEFF" | Champion  Promoted
| style="background: "|Last 32
| –
|-
|style="background:#efefef;"|2013–14
| align="center"| 2
| LNB Pro B
| style="background: " align="center"| 17
| align=left bgcolor=#FFCCCC|Relegated
| Last 32
| –
|-

Notable players

 Vassil Evtimov 1 season: '13-'14
 Ibrahim Saounera 
 DeJuan Wright 1 year: 2013
 Marc Salyers 1 year: 2013

References

External links
 Official website 

Orchies